The Caddo Valley Academy Complex is a collection of former school buildings in Norman, Arkansas.  Set well back from Main Street (Arkansas Highway 8 near the junction of 9th Street and Smokey Hollow Road, the complex includes a two-story fieldstone main building, a smaller single-story home economics building (located down the slope northwest of the main building), both located northwest of 9th Street, and a large concrete block gym with a gabled roof, located across 9th Street from the other two.  The main school, built in 1924, is an outstanding local example of Craftsman styling; the 1937 home economics building also has Craftsman style; the gym was built in 1951, and is vernacular in style.  The school was used until the local schools were consolidated into a new facility in 1971.

The complex was listed on the National Register of Historic Places in 2002. The main school was designed by Bayard Witt of the firm Witt, Seibert & Halsey of Texarkana, Arkansas.

See also
National Register of Historic Places listings in Montgomery County, Arkansas

References

School buildings on the National Register of Historic Places in Arkansas
School buildings completed in 1924
Historic districts on the National Register of Historic Places in Arkansas
National Register of Historic Places in Montgomery County, Arkansas
1924 establishments in Arkansas
Education in Montgomery County, Arkansas
American Craftsman architecture in Arkansas